Pietà is a c.1455–1460 tempera on panel painting by Giovanni Bellini, now in the Museo Poldi Pezzoli in Milan. One of his earliest works, it is the prototype for his long series of other Pietas such as Pietà (Bergamo).

Bibliography
Mariolina Olivari, Giovanni Bellini, in AA.VV., Pittori del Rinascimento, Scala, Firenze 2007. 

1460 paintings
Paintings by Giovanni Bellini
Paintings in the collection of the Museo Poldi Pezzoli